Central University of Odisha (CUO), formerly Central University of Orissa, was established by parliament under the Central Universities Act, 2009 (No. 3C of 2009) by Government of India, situated at Sunabeda Town, Koraput District in the Indian state of Odisha. The territorial jurisdiction of the university is whole of the Odisha state.

History
The university was established in 2009 as Central University of Orissa, by parliament under the Central Universities Act. It is one of 20 new Central Universities established by the Government of India during the UGC XI Plan period to address the concerns of "equity and access" and as per the policy of the Government of India to increase the access to quality higher education by people in less educationally developed districts which have a Graduate Enrollment Ratio of less than the national average of 11%.

Prof. (Dr.) Surabhi Banerjee was the first and founding Vice Chancellor of the university.

In August 2019 it was renamed Central University of Odisha through the Central Universities (Amendment) Act, 2019.

Campus

The site is located in village Chikapar and Chakarliput coming under Sunabeda NAC (Urban area). It is close to Hindustan Aeronautics Limited (HAL), Sunabeda. A road constructed over the acquired land of Indian Navy for the purposes of the Naval Armament Depot joins the proposed site from N.H. 43 at the point of Sunabeda Junction-1 (about 6 km.). Dumuriput railway station is 5 km from Sunabeda-1 Junction. Damanjodi railway station is 15 km.  Koraput railway station is 25 km.  The land size is 450 acres spreading over village Chikapar (Ac. 310.96) and the adjoining Chakarliput (Ac. 139.13).

Organisation and administration

School and Department

School of Languages
 Department of Odia Language & Literature (DOLL)
 Department of English Language & Literature (DELL)
 Department of Hindi (DH)
 Department of Sanskrit (DSkt)

School of Social Sciences
 Department of Anthropology (DA) 
 Department of Economics (DE)
 Department of Sociology (DS) 

School of Education & Education Technology
 Department of Journalism & Mass Communication (DJMC)
 Department of Teacher Education (DTE) 

School of Basic Sciences & Information Sciences
 Department of Computer Science (DCS)
 Department of Mathematics (DM) 

School of Commerce and Management
 Department of Business Management (DBM) -  
School of Biodiversity & Conservation of Natural Resources
 Department of Biodiversity & Conservation of Natural Resources (DBCNR)

School of Applied Science
 Department of Statistics (DSTAT)

Facilities

Central library
Soon after the formal appearance of the Central Library in the year 2009, immediate emphasis was given for a good collection development on Text Books and Reference Books. Besides holding an excellent print collection of over 38531+ volumes of books, it also provides access to popular magazines, selected journals, theses, reports, e-books, e-journals and online databases in Sciences, Humanities,  and Social Sciences. The library made a significant progress during the year 2011-12 by empanelling 16 vendors for supply of Books & Journals to give a boost to the procurement process. Apart from the procurement on print books, the Central Library achieved phenomenal progress in the subscription of e-resources by subscribing 8000+ e-resources (full text as well as bibliographical databases) to its digital collection making "24 x 7 Library" in real scene on the present campus of CUO @ Landiguda.

Computer Centre 
The Central University of Odisha has made arrangements for net connectivity through BSNL broad-band services. About 30 terminals/portals are put into service of the residents and teachers. This service would enhance the interactive, communicative and knowledge addition at Central University of Odisha.

Student life

Hostel 
The Boys' and Girls' hostel in the University campus provide state of art infrastructure along with hygienic mess facilities. The hostel's are (G+3) of 7,735 sq. mtr. (Plinth area) having 236 rooms, of 105 square ft each.

Guest House 
The Guest House in the University campus provides state of art infrastructure. It is (G+3) of 2,957 sq. mtr. (Plinth area) having with 32 rooms and 08 suits with the provision of lift. It is located in sylvan surrounding and has a banquet hall, a conference hall, lobby, dining hall and rooms of different categories.

References

External links
 

Central universities in India
Universities in Odisha
Koraput district
Educational institutions established in 2009
2009 establishments in Orissa